Chaloner or Challoner is an English surname which may refer to:

David Chaloner (1944–2010), English poet 
Frank Challoner (1853–1899), American businessman and politician
Gary Chaloner (born 1963), Australian comic book artist and writer
James Chaloner or Challoner (1602–1660), English politician
John Challoner (c.1520–1581), British politician and administrator
John Armstrong Chaloner (1862–1935), American writer and activist
John Seymour Chaloner (1924–2007), British journalist
Kathryn Chaloner (1954–2014), British-American statistician
Luke Challoner (1550–1613), Irish academic
Mark Chaloner (born 1972), English professional squash player
Paul Chaloner (born 1971), British video game presenter and commentator
Richard Challoner (1691–1781), English Roman Catholic bishop
Richard Chaloner, 1st Baron Gisborough (1856–1938), British soldier and politician
Richard Chaloner, 3rd Baron Gisborough (born 1927), British nobleman
Robert Chaloner (priest) (1548–1621), English priest, Canon of Windsor
Robert Chaloner (MP) (1776–1842), English Member of Parliament and Lord Mayor of York
Robert Challoner (1872–1955), Australian rugby union player
Thomas Chaloner (disambiguation), several people
William Chaloner (1650–1699), English confidence trickster
William Challoner or Chaloner (fl.1709–1734), English slave trader
William Gilbert Chaloner (1928–2016), British palaeobotanist

See also
Chaloner baronets
Chaloner (locomotive)

Surnames of English origin
Surnames of British Isles origin